Flyleaf Press is a publishing company based in Dublin, Ireland. It was founded in 1987 by James Ryan and publishes guides and references for Irish family history and genealogy. These include a series of guides on tracing ancestors in several counties of Ireland. Flyleaf Press is a member of CLÉ, the Irish Book Publishers' Association.

References

External links
Flyleaf Press website
Flyleaf Facebook page
Genealogy & History News review

Publishing companies of the Republic of Ireland
Publishing companies established in 1987
Book publishing companies of Ireland
Irish companies established in 1987